Dorian Morris Goldfeld (born January 21, 1947) is an American mathematician working in analytic number theory and automorphic forms at Columbia University.

Professional career
Goldfeld received his B.S. degree in 1967 from Columbia University. His doctoral dissertation, entitled "Some Methods of Averaging in the Analytical Theory of Numbers", was completed under the supervision of Patrick X. Gallagher in 1969, also at Columbia.  He has held positions at the University of California at Berkeley (Miller Fellow, 1969–1971), Hebrew University (1971–1972), Tel Aviv University (1972–1973), Institute for Advanced Study (1973–1974), in Italy (1974–1976), at MIT (1976–1982), University of Texas at Austin (1983–1985) and Harvard (1982–1985). Since 1985, he has been a professor at Columbia University.

He is a member of the editorial board of Acta Arithmetica and of The Ramanujan Journal. On January 1, 2018 he became the Editor-in-Chief of the Journal of Number Theory.

He is a co-founder and board member of Veridify Security, formerly SecureRF, a corporation that has developed the world's first linear-based security solutions.

Goldfeld advised several doctoral students including M. Ram Murty. In 1986, he brought Shou-Wu Zhang to the United States to study at Columbia.

Research interests

Goldfeld's research interests include various topics in number theory. In his thesis, he proved a version of Artin's conjecture on primitive roots on the average without the use of the Riemann Hypothesis.

In 1976, Goldfeld provided an ingredient for the effective solution of Gauss' class number problem for imaginary quadratic fields. (Such a curve was found soon after by Gross and Zagier). This effective lower bound then allows the determination of all imaginary fields with a given class number after a finite number of computations.

His work on the Birch and Swinnerton-Dyer conjecture includes the proof of an estimate for a partial Euler product associated to an elliptic curve, bounds for the
order of the Tate–Shafarevich group.

Together with his collaborators, Dorian Goldfeld has introduced the theory of multiple Dirichlet series,  objects that extend the fundamental Dirichlet series in one variable.

Together with his wife, Dr. Iris Anshel, and father-in-law, Dr. Michael Anshel, both mathematicians, Dorian Goldfeld founded the field of braid group cryptography.

Awards and honors
In 1987 he received the Frank Nelson Cole Prize in Number Theory, one of the prizes in Number Theory, for his solution of Gauss' class number problem for imaginary quadratic fields. He has also held the  Sloan Fellowship (1977–1979) and in 1985 he received the Vaughan prize. In 1986 he was an invited speaker at the International Congress of Mathematicians in Berkeley. In April 2009 he was elected a Fellow of the American Academy of Arts and Sciences. In 2012 he became a fellow of the American Mathematical Society.

Selected works

References

External links

 Dorian Goldfeld's Home Page at Columbia University

20th-century American mathematicians
21st-century American mathematicians
Fellows of the American Academy of Arts and Sciences
Fellows of the American Mathematical Society
Number theorists
Columbia School of Engineering and Applied Science alumni
Columbia University faculty
University of California, Berkeley faculty
Academic staff of the Hebrew University of Jerusalem
Academic staff of Tel Aviv University
Institute for Advanced Study visiting scholars
University of Texas at Austin faculty
Harvard University faculty
1947 births
Living people
People from Marburg